Innerdouny Hill (497 m) is a hill in the Ochil Hills of Perth and Kinross, Scotland. It is located northwest of the town of Kinross. The second highest Marilyn of the Ochils after Ben Cleuch, its slopes are heavily forested but the summit area is clear

References

Mountains and hills of Perth and Kinross
Marilyns of Scotland